Removing article from place open to the public is a statutory offence in England and Wales and Northern Ireland.

England and Wales 
This offence is created by section 11(1) of the Theft Act 1968. Sections 11(1) to (3) of that Act read:

The following cases are relevant:
R v Durkin [1973] 1 QB 786, 57 Cr App R 637, [1973] 2 All ER 872, [1973] Crim LR 372, CA
R v Barr [1978] Crim LR 244

Section 11(3)

Edward Griew said that section 11(3) corresponds to sections 2(1)(a) and (b) (as to which, see dishonesty).

Visiting forces

This offence is an offence against property for the purposes of section 3 of the Visiting Forces Act 1952.

Mode of trial and sentence

This offence is triable either way. A person guilty of this offence is liable, on conviction on indictment, to imprisonment for a term not exceeding five years, or on summary conviction to imprisonment for a term not exceeding six months, or to a fine not exceeding the prescribed sum, or to both.

"The Goya clause"

The clause of the Theft Bill that became section 11 was popularly known as the "Goya clause". The name referred to the unauthorised removal of Goya's portrait of the Duke of Wellington from the National Gallery.

Criticism

Edward Griew said that the complexity of this offence is disproportionate to its importance.

Northern Ireland 
This offence is created by section 11(1) of the Theft Act (Northern Ireland) 1969. Section 11 of that Act is derived from section 11 of the Theft Act 1968.

Visiting forces

This offence is an offence against property for the purposes of section 3 of the Visiting Forces Act 1952.

Mode of trial

This offence is an indictable offence which may be tried summarily upon consent of the accused. See hybrid offence.

Sentence

A person guilty of this offence is liable, on conviction on indictment, to imprisonment for a term not exceeding five years, or on summary conviction to imprisonment for a term not exceeding twelve months, or to a fine not exceeding the prescribed sum, or to both.

References 

Crimes
English law
Welsh law
Law of Northern Ireland